Ahvaz International Airport  is an airport serving the city of Ahvaz, Iran. It offers flights to domestic destinations as well as regional international destinations, such as Dubai, Istanbul (Currently not in use) and Kuwait.

Airlines and destinations

Accidents and incidents
On 13 April 1970, Douglas C-47B EP-AGZ of the Air Taxi Co. stalled on take-off and crashed. The aircraft was destroyed by the subsequent fire. It was operating a non-scheduled passenger flight. All 25 people on board survived.

Airport move and rename
In December 2012, Agence France-Presse reported that Ahwaz airport was to be relocated because oil had been discovered underneath it.

See also
Iran Civil Aviation Organization
Transport in Iran
List of airports in Iran
List of the busiest airports in Iran
List of airlines of Iran

References

Airports in Iran
Transportation in Khuzestan Province
Buildings and structures in Khuzestan Province